My Love Is Your Love is the fourth studio album by American singer Whitney Houston, released worldwide on November 17, 1998. It was Houston's first studio album in eight years, following I'm Your Baby Tonight (1990) although she had participated on three movie soundtracks during that period. My Love Is Your Love is composed of mid-tempo R&B, hip hop soul, pop and dance music, produced by musicians such as Rodney Jerkins, Soulshock & Karlin, Missy Elliott, Wyclef Jean, David Foster, Lauryn Hill, and Babyface. 

It is notable for introducing elements of hip hop into Houston's work, only sparingly used in her previous material. Although the album sold less than Houston's previous albums in the US, it was globally successful selling over 10 million copies. It was certified four times platinum in the United States. Particularly, the album was a hit in Europe, peaking #1 for 6 weeks on European Top 100 Albums, selling over 4.3 million copies. It generated several hit singles: "When You Believe", a duet with Mariah Carey, which won an Academy Award for Best Original Song for at the 71st Annual Academy Awards ceremony; "Heartbreak Hotel", which features Kelly Price and Faith Evans; "It's Not Right but It's Okay". The title track "My Love Is Your Love", was certified platinum and became Houston's third-best-selling single ever; and "I Learned from the Best".

My Love Is Your Love received positive reviews. At the 42nd Grammy Awards of 2000, the album received seven nominations, including Best R&B Album and Best R&B Song, twice. Houston won for Best Female R&B Vocal Performance for "It's Not Right But It's Okay", her sixth and final Grammy Award.

Critical reception

Upon the album's debut, the album received positive responses from music critics. Rob Sheffield of Rolling Stone magazine commented that "It's easily her most consistent album ever—in fact, it's her first consistent album", and praised her mature voice as follows:

Jon Pareles, in his review for the New York Times, praised her fully developed voice, too. He stated that her sound was "supple and devout", comparing Carey's fidgetting sound with every phrase in "When You Believe", and commented "Ms. Houston used to be similarly showy and disjointed, but now her improvisations bring emotional coherence to technical feats." With expressing his interest about any connections between her troubled marriage and her new materials, commented "Lest anyone draw other conclusions from the songs, the album carries a disclaimer." Also, he was almost positive about songs such as "It's Not Right But It's Okay", "Heartbreak Hotel" and "My Love Is Your Love".
In Billboard magazine's review, the issue dated November 28, 1999, the magazine called the album "A tour de force that showcases her strengths in a wide array of musical genres from pop to R&B to gospel to dance." The publication also opined: "On an album with writing and production input from a diverse roster of players, Houston keeps it all together with her spectacular voice and singular artistic persona", declaring the album had "immense crossover potential"

Mark Bautz of Entertainment Weekly gave the album B+, calling My Love Is Your Love "A schizophrenic album" and "A primer on today's hip-hop/R&B scene: the good, the bad." by reason of the unevenness of the album. He commented "Wyclef Jean's gorgeous reggae-tinged title song and three funky cuts by Rodney Jerkins showcase the 35-year-old Whitney Houston in all her creative, soulful maturity. In contrast, a trio of schmaltzy Babyface-produced tunes expose her as merely a gifted interpreter of bland radio-ready fare.". Similarly, TIME praised some new songs, calling the title song "superb" and Houston's remake of Stevie Wonder's classic "fabulous", but criticized the old-fashioned songs of the album sharply, commenting "The problem is with the Old Guard: producer David Foster's work is dull, and Dianne Warren and Babyface, who both wrote tracks, have better work on their respective resumes."

Writing for USA Today in November 1998, Steve Jones made a favorable comment on almost every song whether it is a ballad with her formula for success or a new styled song produced by hot, young producers who've updated and diversified her sound, stating "There's something here for just about everybody, whether you favor R&B, pop or adult contemporary radio." But he chose the remake "I Was Made To Love Him" as the best track of the album, complimenting the song highly, "The rollicking, gender-flipping remake".  Stephen Thomas Erlewine from Allmusic, who gave the album four out of five stars, called it "easily ranks among her best" and complimented the musical diversity "Houston has never been quite so subtle before, nor has she ever shown this desire to branch out musically." But he also wasn't positive for adult contemporary ballads of the album, stating "In fact, the songs that feel the stiffest are the big production numbers; tellingly, they're the songs that are the most reminiscent of old-school Houston." Los Angeles Times gave it three out of four stars, writing "[It] reflect her growth as an artist and as an individual."

Commercial performance
In the United States, My Love Is Your Love was released on November 17, 1998, when major records were released simultaneously for the holidays by high-profile musicians like Garth Brooks, Mariah Carey, Celine Dion, Jewel, Method Man, The Offspring and Seal besides her. Time magazine wrote, "Music-industry folks have dubbed it Super Tuesday because more than ten major pop acts issued new CDs on the single day, making it the heaviest release date ever."  The week of December 5, 1998, the album entered the US Billboard 200 chart at number thirteen, which was the peak position of the album, and her lowest chart position at that point in time, with sales of 123,000 copies in its first week. That result was disappointing because the release was Houston's first non-soundtrack album in eight years and was highly anticipated. But eventually, the album became a commercial success, thanks to a series of hit singles, her energetic promotions and a successful world tour. My Love Is Your Love was present on the Billboard 200 chart for over a year, at 75 weeks, and on Billboard Top R&B/Hip-Hop Albums chart for 79 weeks, peaking at number seven. The Recording Industry Association of America (RIAA) certified the album four-times platinum on November 1, 1999, for shipments of four million copies. According to the Nielson SoundScan, the album has sold 2,753,000 copies.

Across Europe, it was more successful than in the United States. In early times of its release, the commercial response for the album was short of expectations, but its sales rose sharply during the European leg of the My Love Is Your Love World Tour, which was the highest grossing arena concert tour of 1999 on the continent, and consequently My Love Is Your Love became the second best-selling album of 1999 in Europe, behind Cher's Believe, spending more than one year on the charts in many countries. In the United Kingdom, it reached number four on the albums chart and was certified 3× Platinum for shipments of 900,000 copies of the album by the British Phonographic Industry(BPI). In France, the album peaked at number two on the albums chart, and was certified 2× platinum by the Syndicat National de l'Édition Phonographique (SNEP). In Germany, it climbed to the number two on the albums chart on its 35th week and has sold more than 670,000 copies. The album reached number one on the albums charts in Austria, Switzerland and Netherlands, and the top five in Belgium, Denmark, Norway and Finland. My Love Is Your Love was certified 4× platinum by the International Federation of the Phonographic Industry (IFPI) for shipments of four million copies of the album in Europe.
Worldwide, the album has sold over 10 million copies.

Singles
All five singles released from My Love Is Your Love were successful worldwide. In the United States, they were all top forty Billboard Hot 100 hits, with three reaching the top five on the chart, selling a total of 3.9 million copies. The album generated two Platinum and two Gold singles, awarded by the Recording Industry Association of America in 1999. In later years, four of the five singles would be re-certified platinum. In the United Kingdom, Houston also had five top forty singles including three top five hits from the album, with a total of 1.09 million copies sold, becoming the eighth best-selling singles artist of 1999. The singles also achieved success in other countries such as Canada, Germany, Sweden, and Switzerland.

"When You Believe", duet with Mariah Carey, was released as the lead single of the album on November 2, 1998. The song debuted at number fifty-one without retail single on the new Billboard Hot 100 chart, which had changed to allow airplay-only tracks to enter the chart, the issue date of December 5, 1998. Before release, it led to expectations that the song would be a smash hit due to the star power of two music rivals. However, after the single had released, it managed to peak at number fifteen on the chart, the issue dated January 30, 1999. It reached number thirty-three on the Billboard Hot R&B Singles & Tracks chart. Billboard was unfavorable towards the single, commenting "Given the potential of these two [Houston and Carey] powerhouse voices, however, the song falls flat with a surprisingly understated and downright disappointing bridge: You wait and wait for the duel of the divas, and it simply never materializes," but positive of Houston's performance; "The genuine story in this track is the return of Houston, who sounds fantasticㅡas clear and confident as ever." The RIAA certified it Gold for shipments of 500,000 copies on March 24, 1999. Unlike in the United States, the single was a success on the world charts. It reached the top five in the U.K. with 260,000 copies sold, Belgium, France, Italy, Netherlands, Norway, Spain, Sweden, Switzerland, and the top ten in Austria, Denmark, Finland, Germany, Ireland, and New Zealand. Thanks to popularity for the song across Europe, it eventually peaked at number two on the Eurochart Hot 100.

The album's second single, "Heartbreak Hotel", was released on December 15, 1998, and features Faith Evans and Kelly Price. The song entered the Billboard Hot 100 chart at number eighty-four on the issue date of December 26, 1998. In its first week when the song was commercially available, it leaped to number twenty-nine, and after six weeks peaked at number two on the Hot 100, making it the first Houston single to peak in the runner-up spot. The song entered the revamped Billboard Hot R&B Singles & Tracks chart at number twenty-three with the mark of its seventh week on the chart, the issue date of January 9, 1999. In Its first week of retail release, it reached the number six and the following week topped the chart, becoming her eighth No.1 single on the Hot R&B chart. The single stayed on the summit for seven consecutive weeks from February 13 to March 27, 1999, which was her third longest stay atop this chart behind "I Will Always Love You" for eleven weeks and "Exhale (Shoop Shoop)" for eight weeks, and was on the chart for a total of thirty-one weeks. The single sold over 1,400,000 copies in the U.S. alone, becoming the third-best-selling single of 1999, and was certified Platinum by the RIAA on March 2, 1999.

"It's Not Right, But It's Okay" was released as the third single from the album on February 22, 1999. Before May, it was featured as the B-side of maxi-singles with "Heartbreak Hotel", and charted on the Hot 100 and Hot R&B with its only airplay and sales of maxi-singles. The song appeared firstly at number sixty-four on the Hot R&B Singles & Tracks chart, the issue date of January 9, 1999. It rose higher position of the chart steadily, and eventually reached its peak position, number seven, in its twenty-fourth week on the chart. On the Hot 100 chart, the single debuted at number eighty-seven, the issue date of May 8, 1999, and after the regular-length cassette & CD configurations had hit stores, peaked at number four, selling 522,000 copies in the United States. The RIAA certified it Gold on June 29, 1999. It was also successful in the United Kingdom. The single reached the number three on the singles chart, making it her twelfth top ten hits, and sold over 510,000 units, ranked at number twenty-five in the list of UK's best-selling singles in 1999. In Canada, it made rare chart performances, peaking at number three for the regular single and number five for its import single simultaneously on the Canadian SoundScan Singles chart in August 1999. After her European promotion during February in 1999, it was popular in many countries of Europe, reaching the number one in Spain, top twenty in Austria, Germany, Netherlands, Switzerland, and Sweden. Finally it peaked at number nine on the Eurochart Hot 100.

The title track, "My Love Is Your Love" was the fourth single from the album on June 26, 1999. It was a massive hit worldwide, becoming another signature song for Whitney. Firstly, the single was released in each country of Europe from June 1999, prior to the United States. Upon release, the song was popular immediately across Europe, and became a bigger hit during her My Love Is Your Love European Tour. In the U.K., it went straight to its peak position, number two, on the singles chart, the issue date of July 3, 1999. The single sold 525,000 copies, becoming the twenty-second best-selling single of 1999. In Germany, it peaked at number two and was certified Platinum for shipments of 500,000 copies by the Bundesverband Musikindustrie (BVMI). It also reached the number two in countries such as Austria, Ireland, the Netherlands, Sweden, and Switzerland. It went to top ten in Belgium, Denmark, France, and Norway. Eventually the single topped the Eurochart Hot 100 for a week, becoming her fourth number one single, and was positioned at number six in the Europe's Top Singles list of 1999. In New Zealand, it peaked at number one for a week, which was Houston's third number-one single after 1987's "I Wanna Dance with Somebody (Who Loves Me)" and 1992's "I Will Always Love You". Likewise, it was a hit in the United States. The song debuted at number eighty-one on the Billboard Hot 100 chart in September 1999 and peaked at number four in January 2000, becoming her 22nd top ten hit. In addition, it reached the number two position on the Hot R&B Singles & Tracks chart, spending a total of twenty-nine weeks on the chart. The single sold 1,100,000 copies and was certified Platinum by the RIAA on December 14, 1999. Worldwide it sold over 3 million copies and became her third-best-selling single ever, behind "I Will Always Love You" and "I Wanna Dance with Somebody (Who Loves Me)", with 12 million and 4.2 million copies sold, respectively.

"I Learned from the Best" became the fifth and final single to be released from the album on November 29, 1999, in the UK, and on February 22, 2000, in the United States. The song debuted at number eighty-three on the Hot 100 and peaked at number twenty-seven. It reached the number thirteen on the Hot R&B Singles & Tracks. According to the Nielsen SoundScan, the single sold 352,000 units in the United States alone. Outside the U.S., it wasn't successful as big as the previous singles from the album. The single reached the number six in Finland, the number eight in Spain, and the number nineteen in the United Kingdom with 95,000 copies sold. Besides, it went to the top forty in the Netherlands, Sweden, and Switzerland.

Billboard Hot Dance Music chart
The songs with various remix versions, released from My Love Is Your Love, were very popular in dance clubs and smash hits on the Billboard Dance Music chart. Four consecutive singles reached the number one on the Billboard Hot Dance Music/Club Play chartㅡ"It's Not Right But It's Okay" for three weeks, "Heartbreak Hotel" for a week, "My Love Is Your Love" for two weeks, and "I Learned from the Best" for three weeks. Moreover, the maxi-singles, released as vinyl, cassette and CD formats, were successful on the Billboard Dance Music/Maxi-Singles Sales chart. "My Love Is Your Love" topped the chart for two weeks, and "I Learned from the Best" for one week. "Heartbreak Hotel/It's Not Right But It's Okay" and "It's Not Right But It's Okay/I Will Always Love You" peaked at number two on the chart, respectively.

Promotion and appearances

Tour

Concerts
Houston performed three sold-out concerts, two shows a few days before the album's release, on November 13 and 14 at the Taj Mahal in Atlantic City. Both concerts showcased new songs from the album as well as hit songs from previous releases. Several media critics as well as a host of celebrities attended, including Luther Vandross, Brandy, and Wyclef Jean. The third show on November 19, Houston performed an expensive invitation-only charity concert at Cipriani's Wall Street's Grand Ballroom, audience attendees included Clive Davis, Kevin Costner, P. Diddy, Babyface, Mary J. Blige, and wealthy business socialites.

Set list

"Video Interlude" (contain elements of "When You Believe)"
"I'm Every Woman"
"Queen of the Night"
"I Wanna Dance with Somebody (Who Loves Me)"
"I Learned from the Best"
"You Give Good Love" 
"Saving All My Love for You"
"Greatest Love of All" 
Diana Ross Medley: "Endless Love" (with Gary Houston) / "Ain't No Mountain High Enough" / "The Boss"
"How Will I Know"
"All the Man That I Need"
"My Love Is Your Love"
"If I Told You That"
"Exhale (Shoop Shoop)"
"I Believe in You and Me
"I Love the Lord"
"I Will Always Love You"
"I Was Made to Love Him" 
"Step by Step"

Notes

Shows

TV

Track listing

Notes
 denotes additional producer

Personnel
Adapted from AllMusic.

 Babyface – drum programming, guest artist, keyboards, producer, programming, background vocals
 Jerry Barnes – bass
 Sherrod Barnes – guitar
 Ali Boudris – acoustic guitar
 Paul Boutin – engineer
 Tim Boyle – engineer
 Mariah Carey – guest artist
 Sue Ann Carwell – background vocals
 Beverly Crowder – background vocals
 James “Petawane” Burris(Eric Cherry's Family & Friend's Ensemble) - backgrounds vocals
 Clive Davis – producer
Robyn Crawford - Production Coordination
Donna Houston - Manager (Nippy Inc.)
Lynne Volkman - Director of Publicity (Nippy Inc.)
Alan Jacobs - Director of Security (Nippy Inc.)
Silvia Vejar - Personal Assistant to Ms. Houston (Nippy Inc.)
Danny Markowitz - Publicity Intern Tour (Nippy Inc.)
 Loren Dawson – strings
 Jerry "Wonda" Duplessis – producer
 Nathan East – bass
 Felipe Elgueta – engineer
 Missy Elliott – guest artist, producer
 Missy "Misdemeanor" Elliott – featured artist, vocals
 Toni Estes – background vocals
 Faith Evans – featured artist, guest artist
 Paul J. Falcone – engineer, mixing
 David Foster – arranger, guest artist, keyboards, producer
 Jon Gass – mixing
 Humberto Gatica – engineer
 Sharlotte Gibson – background vocals
 Brad Gilderman – engineer, mixing
 Gavin Greenaway – conductor
 Mick Guzauski – mixing
 Whitney Houston – primary artist, producer, vocals, background vocals
 Wyclef Jean –  producer
 Rodney Jerkins – drum programming, keyboards, producer, strings
 Karlin – arranger, producer
 Larry Kimpel – bass
 Ricky Lawson – drums
 Manny Marroquin – engineer, mixing
 Bill Meyers – conductor
 Don Murray – engineer
 Kevin Parker – engineer
 Greg Phillinganes – piano
 Kelly Price – featured artist, guest artist
 Eric Rigler – pipe
 William Ross – arranger, conductor
 Sheila E. – guest artist, percussion
 John Smeltz – engineer
 V. Jeffrey Smith – flute
 Soulshock – arranger, mixing, producer
 Michael Thompson – guitar
 Ryan Toby – vocals
 Tommy Vicari – engineer
 Shanice Wilson – background vocals
 Hans Zimmer – arranger
 Ray Cervenka – Pro Tools consultant

Charts

Weekly charts

Year-end charts

Decade-end charts

Certifications and sales

Accolades

Academy Awards

|-
| width="35" align="center"|1999 || "When You Believe" (Duet with Mariah Carey) || Best Original Song (the songwriter: Stephen Schwartz) || 
|-

American Latino Media Arts (ALMA) Awards

|-
| width="35" align="center" rowspan="2"|1999 || rowspan="2"|"When You Believe" (Duet with Mariah Carey) || Outstanding Performance of a Song for a Feature Film || 
|-
|Outstanding Music Video || 
|-

American Music Awards
During Houston's career, she was nominated a total of seven times for "Favorite Pop/Rock Female Artist" and "Favorite Soul/R&B Female Artist" category, which of them won four and three respectively. Also, My Love Is Your Love was her fourth nomination for "Favorite Soul/R&B Album" category.

|-
| width="35" align="center" rowspan="3"|2000 || rowspan="2"|Whitney Houston (herself) || |Favorite Pop/Rock Female Artist || 
|-
| Favorite Soul/R&B Female Artist || 
|-
| My Love Is Your Love || Favorite Soul/R&B Album || 
|-

Bambi Verleihung (Bambi Awards)
Houston was honored with "Pop International" award for her 20 years outstanding career as a musical artist.

|-
| width="35" align="center"|1999 || align="center"|— || Pop International || 
|-

Billboard Music Awards

|-
| width="35" align="center" rowspan="3"|1999 || Whitney Houston (herself) || Female Artist of the Year || 
|-
| rowspan="2"|"Heartbreak Hotel"(Featuring Faith Evans and Kelly Price) || Hot 100 Single of the Year || 
|-
| R&B Single of the Year || 
|-

Blockbuster Entertainment Awards

|-
| width="35" align="center"|1999 || My Love Is Your Love || Faverite Female Artist, R&B || 
|-
| width="35" align="center" rowspan="3"|2000 || My Love Is Your Love || Favorite Female Artist, R&B || 
|-
| "Heartbreak Hotel"(Featuring Faith Evans and Kelly Price) || Favorite Single || 
|-
| "When You Believe" (Duet with Mariah Carey) || Favorite Song from a Movie || 
|-

BMI Pop Awards
All winners are determined by the number of feature broadcast performances on American radio and TV during the eligibility year.

|-
| width="35" align="center" rowspan="3"|2000 || "Heartbreak Hotel" || BMI Pop Award (Karlin, Soulshock) || 
|-
| "It's Not Right But It's Okay" || BMI Pop Award (Fred Jerkins, Rodney Jerkins) || 
|-
| "When You Believe" || BMI Pop Award (Kenneth "Babyface" Edmonds) || 
|-
| width="35" align="center"|2001 || "My Love Is Your Love" || BMI Pop Award (Jerry "Wonder" Duplessis) ||

BRIT Awards

|-
| width="35" align="center"|2000 || Whitney Houston (herself) || Best International Female Artist || 
|-

Golden Globe Awards

|-
| width="35" align="center"|1999 || "When You Believe" (Duet with Mariah Carey) || Best Original Song, Motion Picture (the songwriter: Stephen Schwartz) || 
|-

Grammy Awards
Houston won her first "Best Female R&B Vocal Performance" award through her career. She had been nominated six times for this category but not won. This was her sixth and final Grammy Award.

|-
| align="center" rowspan="7"|2000 || "When You Believe"  || Best Pop Collaboration With Vocals || 
|-
| "It's Not Right But It's Okay" || Best Female R&B Vocal Performance || 
|-
| My Love Is Your Love || Best R&B Album || 
|-
| rowspan="2"|"Heartbreak Hotel"  || Best R&B Performance by a Duo or Group with Vocal || 
|-
| Best R&B Song (the songwriters: Kenneth Karlin, Tamara Savage and Carsten Schack) || 
|-
| "It Not Right But It's Okay" || Best R&B Song (the songwriters: LaShawn Daniels, Tony Estes, Fred Jerkins III, Rodney Jerkins, and Isaac Phillips) || 
|-
| "When You Believe"  || Best Song Written for a Motion Picture, Television or Other Visual Media (the songwriters: Stephen Schwartz, Babyface) || 
|-

MOBO (Music of Black Origin) Awards

|-
| width="35" align="center"|1999 || Whitney Houston (herself) || Best International Act || 
|-

MTV Europe Music Awards

|-
| width="35" align="center" rowspan="2"|1999 || rowspan="2"|Whitney Houston (herself) || Best Female || 
|-
|Best R&B || 
|-

MTV Video Music Awards
Houston was nominated for "Best R&B Video" for "Heartbreak Hotel" music video directed by Kevin Bray, which was her first nomination in thirteen years at VMAs since she has won the "Best Female Video" for "How Will I Know" at the 1986 MTV Video Music Awards.

|-
| width="35" align="center"|1999 || "Heartbreak Hotel" || Best R&B Video || 
|-

NAACP Image Awards

|-
| width="35" align="center" rowspan="5"|1999 || My Love Is Your Love || Outstanding Female Artist || 
|-
| rowspan="3"|"When You Believe"  || Outstanding Duo or Group || 
|-
|Outstanding Music Video || 
|-
|Outstanding Song || 
|-
| My Love Is Your Love || Outstanding Album || 
|-
| width="35" align="center" rowspan="2"|2000 || "Heartbreak Hotel"  || Outstanding Female Artist || 
|-
| "My Love Is Your Love" || Outstanding Song || 
|-

NRJ Music Awards

|-
| width="35" align="center" rowspan="2"|2000 || Whitney Houston (herself) || Artiste féminine internationale de l'année (International Female Artist of the Year) || 
|-
| My Love Is Your Love || Album international de l'année (International Album of the Year) || 
|-

Recording Industry Association of America (RIAA) Awards
Certification awards

Artists of the Century Awards

|-
| width="35" align="center"|1999 || Whitney Houston (herself) || Top-selling R&B Female Artist of the Century || 
|-

Soul Train Lady of Soul Awards

|-
| width="35" align="center" rowspan="2"|1999 || "Heartbreak Hotel"(Featuring Faith Evans and Kelly Price) || |Best R&B/Soul Single, Group, Band or Duo || 
|-
| My Love Is Your Love || Best R&B/Soul Album of the Year, Solo || 
|-

Soul Train Music Awards
Houston was honored "the Artist of the Decade, female" award in recognition of extraordinary artistic contributions during the 1990s.

|-
| width="35" align="center" rowspan="3"|2000 || "My Love Is Your Love" || |Best R&B/Soul Single, Female || 
|-
| My Love Is Your Love'' || Best R&B/Soul Album, Female
|
|-
|Artistic Achievement Award || The Artist of the Decade — Female || 
|-

Billboard Magazine Year-End Charts

See also
 List of best-selling albums by women

References

1998 albums
Whitney Houston albums
Albums produced by Clive Davis
Albums produced by Rodney Jerkins
Albums produced by David Foster
Albums produced by Missy Elliott
Albums produced by Wyclef Jean
Arista Records albums
Albums produced by Jerry Duplessis
Albums produced by Lauryn Hill
Hip hop soul albums
Albums produced by Whitney Houston